The 1962 Ice Hockey World Championships was the 29th edition of the Ice Hockey World Championships. The tournament was held in Colorado Springs and Denver, United States from March 8 to March 18, 1962. This was the first World Championship hosted in North America that was not part of ice hockey at the Olympic Games.

The World Championships were in jeopardy of being cancelled to the political situation in Europe and the Berlin Wall. Sweden won their third World, and their ninth European title.  Canada, represented by the Galt Terriers, lost only to the Swedes finishing second, followed by the host Americans.  In the 'B' pool the Australian team defeated Denmark for their first victory ever.

Political issues
The World Championships were scheduled to be hosted in Colorado Springs, Colorado, but the event was placed in jeopardy due to the political situation in Europe. When the Berlin Wall was constructed in 1961 by East Germany to prevent its citizens from fleeing to the West, NATO responded with travel restrictions which prevented the East Germany national ice hockey team from attending the World Championships. Canadian Amateur Hockey Association president Jack Roxburgh felt that politics should not affect sports, and the decision went against the goodwill and relations established by teams traveling behind the Iron Curtain. He called for the International Ice Hockey Federation to unite in opposition to the NATO decision. Teams from the Soviet Union and other communist countries ultimately chose to withdraw in protest of the NATO decision.

Qualifying round (A/B)
With the absences of the USSR, Czechoslovakia, and East Germany, the top two nations from the 1961 'B' pool were elevated (Norway and Great Britain).  The third and final spot was filled by a qualifying game between the only remaining 'B' pool nations.

Switzerland qualified in Group A

Austria qualified in Group B

World Championship Group A (United States)

Final round

World Championship Group B (United States)

Final round

Ranking and statistics

Tournament Awards
Best players selected by the directorate:
Best Goaltender:       Lennart Häggroth
Best Defenceman:       John Mayasich
Best Forward:          Sven Tumba
Media All-Star Team:
Goaltender:  Lennart Häggroth
Defence:  Jack Douglas,  Harry Smith
Forwards:  Jackie McLeod,  Nisse Nilsson,  Ulf Sterner

Final standings
The final standings of the tournament according to IIHF:

European championships final standings
The final standings of the European championships according to IIHF:

Notes

References
Championnat du monde 1962

 

IIHF Men's World Ice Hockey Championships
World Championships
1962
World Ice Hockey Championships, 1962
Ice hockey competitions in Denver
Ice hockey competitions in Colorado Springs, Colorado
World Ice Hockey Championships
 
March 1962 sports events in the United States
1960s in Colorado Springs, Colorado
1960s in Denver